Uday Singh Mehta is an American political scientist, currently a Distinguished Professor at City University of New York, and previously the Clarence Francis Professor at Amherst College.

References

City University of New York faculty
American political scientists
Amherst College alumni
Year of birth missing (living people)
Living people